Rosemary Deloford (nee Walsh, born 26 April 1928) is a British former squash and tennis player.

A native of Birmingham, Deloford competed regularly at the Wimbledon Championships during her career. She reached the singles fourth round in 1949, claimed the 1954 All England Plate and was a doubles quarter-finalist in 1955.

Deloford won the Surrey tennis championships in Surbiton in 1955.

As a squash player she was a semi-finalist at both the British Open and U.S. national championships.

Deloford was married to tennis player John Laurence "Jack" Deloford at a London church in 1955.

References

1928 births
Possibly living people
British female tennis players
English female tennis players
English female squash players
Tennis people from the West Midlands (county)
Sportspeople from Birmingham, West Midlands